Rugby Americas North, abbreviated as RAN, is the governing body for rugby union in the North American continental region. Rugby Americas North operates under the authority of World Rugby, and is one of six regional unions represented within it. 

Prior to 2016, the organisation was known as NACRA – the North America Caribbean Rugby Association. The preceding body before 2010 was NAWIRA – the North America and West Indies Rugby Association.

The main objective of RAN is the promotion and development of rugby in North America and the Caribbean. The association unveiled a four-year plan during the 2011 Annual General Meeting to grow rugby within its membership unions through promotion, media output and competition.

World Rugby's 40-member executive council includes two seats for RAN representatives, two seats for Canada, and one for the United States. By contrast to RAN's five votes on the World Rugby executive council, European countries have 16 votes.

Competitions 
RAN oversees regional competitions, such as regional qualifiers for Pan Am Games and Rugby World Cups including:

Senior
 RAN Sevens
 RAN Women's Sevens
 RAN Rugby Championship
  RAN Women's Rugby Championship

Youth
RAN Under-19 Championship

Governance 
RAN is governed by a board of five executives. The USA, Canada and Mexico are fixed representatives, while the Caribbean countries elect two nations for delegation. In November 2021 RAN announced changes to its Executive Committee following its 2021 Annual General Meeting in Miami. George Nicholson was appointed as the new President and Dr. Araba Chintoh and Miguel Carner as Vice President's.

Player registration 

Countries within North America, as of 2010, account for 128,828 rugby players: with the largest number of players from:
 United States (88,151) 
 Canada (23,853)
 Trinidad and Tobago (5,060)
 Mexico (3,454)

Member unions
 Rugby Americas North has 14 full members and 6 associate members:

Regional unions (including former affiliates) without current RAN recognition:
 

Notes:
 Denotes associate member of RAN not affiliated with World Rugby.

 The governing body is the French Rugby Federation which has territorial committees for overseas departments and territories.

World Rugby Rankings

See also 
 World Rugby
 Americas Rugby Championship

Notes

References

External links 

 
Sports organizations established in 2001
2001 establishments in North America